Ministry of Oil and Minerals (Arabic: وزارة  النفط والمعادن ) is a cabinet ministry of Yemen.

List of ministers 

 Saeed Sulaiman al-Shamasi (28 July 2022)
 Abdulsalam Abdullah Baaboud (18 December 2020 – 28 July 2022)
 Aws al-Awd (2017–2020)
 Mohamed Abdullah Nahban (9 November 2014)

See also 

 Politics of Yemen
 Ministry of Oil and Minerals  (in Arabic)

References 

Government ministries of Yemen